Kim Se-hyun (born Kim Young-min, August 7, 1987) is a South Korean pitcher who plays for the SSG Landers in the KBO League. He bats and throws right-handed.

Amateur career
Kim was born in Seoul, and attended  there. He first gained attention in 2004 when he led his team to the national championship and was named Best Pitcher at the 56th , a major competition for high school baseball in South Korea. The following year he helped his team to win its second consecutive championship at the 57th Hwarang Flag National Championship.

Professional career
Kim made himself eligible for the 2006 KBO Draft and was selected as the 17th overall pick in the draft by the Hyundai Unicorns.

He changed his name to Kim Se-hyun in 2015.

References

External links 
Career statistics and player information from Korea Baseball Organization

Kim Se-hyun at Nexen Heroes Baseball Club

South Korean baseball players
Hyundai Unicorns players
Kiwoom Heroes players
Kia Tigers players
KBO League pitchers
1987 births
Living people
Baseball players from Seoul